"Normal shocks" are a fundamental type of shock wave. The waves, which are perpendicular to the flow, are called "normal" shocks. Normal shocks only happen when the flow is supersonic. At those speeds, no obstacle is identified before the speed of sound which makes the molecule return after sensing the obstacle. While returning, the molecule becomes coalescent at certain point. This thin film of molecules act as normal shocks.

Thermodynamic relation across normal shocks

Mach number 

Note that the Mach numbers are given in the reference frame of the shock.

Static pressure

Static temperature

Stagnation pressure

Entropy change

Reference list 

 

Shock waves